The 1911 Nobel Prize in Literature was awarded to the Belgian author Maurice Maeterlinck (1862–1949) "in appreciation of his many-sided literary activities, and especially of his dramatic works, which are distinguished by a wealth of imagination and by a poetic fancy, which reveals, sometimes in the guise of a fairy tale, a deep inspiration, while in a mysterious way they appeal to the readers' own feelings and stimulate their imaginations." He is the first and remains only the Belgian recipient of the prize.

Laureate

Maeterlinck was a symbolist and agnostic who explored the inner lives of people and the subconscious in his surreal plays and poems. His dramas frequently feature shifting and ambiguous milieux and epochs, which enhances the symbolism. He made his debut with the play La Princesse Maleine ("Princess Maleine", 1889). Instead of expressing reality, he focused himself to generating feelings. Since human players would interact with the symbolic, several of Maeterlinck's plays were created for puppets. The puppets, he rgued, were a potent representation of how fate controls people. His most famous plays include L'Intruse ("Intruder", 1890), Les Aveugles ("The Blind", 1890), Pelléas et Mélisande ("Pelléas and Mélisande", 1893), Intérieur ("Interior", 1895), and L'Oiseau bleu ("The Blue Bird", 1908).

Deliberations

Nominations
Maeterlinck was nominated on 8 occasions (two nominations in 1903, three nominations in 1909, single nominations in 1904, 1910, and 1911). For the 1911 prize, which he was awarded eventually, he was nominated by Carl Bildt (1850–1931), member of the Swedish Academy.

In total, the Nobel Committee received 30 nominations for 27 individuals. Ten of the nominees were nominated first-time, among them Karl Adolph Gjellerup (awarded in 1917), Albert de Mun, Gustaf Fröding, George Bernard Shaw (awarded in 1925), Harald Høffding, Henry James, and Peter Rosegger. Two of the nominees were women namely the American historian Molly Elliot Seawell and Austrian writer Marie von Ebner-Eschenbach. The Swedish playwright August Strindberg was nominated for the prize but the nomination arrived too late and was retrieved.

The authors Henry Abbey, Mikhail Albov, Ida Baccini, Vilhelm Bergsøe, Louis Henri Boussenard, Stanisław Brzozowski, Joaquín Costa, Fialho de Almeida, Amelia Denis de Icaza, George Cary Eggleston, W. S. Gilbert, Frances Harper, Knud Karl Krogh-Tonning, Francis March, Richard Barham Middleton, Philippe Monnier, Alexandros Papadiamantis, David Graham Phillips, Joseph Pulitzer, Howard Pyle, Emilio Salgari, Hannah Whitall Smith, Friedrich Spielhagen, Henrietta Stannard, Katherine Thurston, Marie Wexelsen, and Adolf Wilbrandt died in 1911 without having been nominated for the prize. Swedish poet Gustaf Fröding died months before the announcement.

Prize decision
Maeterlinck had been nominated for the prize in 1903, but his candidacy was then dismissed by the Nobel committee chairman Carl David af Wirsén saying that Maeterlinck's writing was partly too obscure, including motifs "of such embarrassing bizarre nature". He was nominated again in 1904, but again was not taken in consideration by the Nobel committee that year. Maeterlinck was nominated again in 1909 and his candidacy was then more positively dealt with by the Nobel committee. Carl David af Wirsén, who had earlier been strongly critical of Maeterlincks candidacy, now launched him as a main candidate for the prize. It has been speculated that Wirsén's reappraisal of Maeterlinck was a way of preventing that Selma Lagerlöf, deeply disliked by Wirsén, was awarded the prize, but also that Wirsén had reached a deeper understanding of Maeterlinck's works. Selma Lagerlöf was awarded the 1909 Nobel Prize in Literature and the following year Maeterlinck was again a strong contender for the prize. In 1911 Wirsén praised Maeterlinck's writing, concluding in his report that "Maeterlinck is (...) a poet of admirable power, and his versatility is, as shown above, surprisingly great. The Nobel committee may also this year propose him as recipient of the literary Nobel Prize. The choice will surely be liked in most quarters, because this poet enjoys a world reputation and his writings are widely read and accepted."

Banquet speech
Maeterlinck was unable to partake in Nobel award ceremony due to illness. Thus, Charles C.M.A.Wauters, Minister of Belgium, delivered Maeterlinck's speech. Prior to the speech, Prof. Karl Mörner, Director of the Royal Institute of Medicine and Surgery, expressed his disappointment that Maeterlinck was not able to be present at the ceremony whom he regarded as "a writer universally known and esteemed, whose poetic creations have filled us with enthusiasm."

Notes

References

External links
Award ceremony speech by C.D. af Wirsén nobelprize.org

1911
Maurice Maeterlinck